Estevan Point is a lighthouse located on the headland of the same name on the Hesquiat Peninsula on the west coast of Vancouver Island, Canada.

During World War II, in 1942, the Estevan Point lighthouse was fired upon by the Japanese submarine , marking the first enemy attack on Canadian soil since the Fenian Raids of 1866 and 1871.

Currently the Canadian Coast Guard still maintains Estevan Point, with the light still active as of 2022.

History
The Spanish explorer Juan José Pérez Hernández, originating from Mallorca, traded with the natives of the region (the Nuu-chah-nulth people) when he explored the area in 1774 and named the headland "Punta San Esteban". Four years later, James Cook's expedition arrived in the Nootka Sound and made contact with the local population.

The lighthouse was established in 1909 as one in a series of buttressed lighthouses designed by engineer William P. Anderson. Originally, a first order Fresnel lens made by Chance Brothers of England had been used but together with the lantern it was dismantled during the 1980s and was then donated to a regional museum in 2004.

Estevan Point lighthouse attack

On June 20, 1942, I-26, under the command of Yokota Minoru, surfaced and shelled the lighthouse, at the same time as 
the  made a similar attack at the mouth of the Columbia River, Oregon, shelling Fort Stevens.

I-26 fired 25–30 rounds of  shells at the Estevan Point lighthouse and radio-direction-finding station, but failed to hit its target and the lighthouse station remained undamaged. Five Royal Canadian Navy patrol vessels and a RCAF Supermarine Stranraer flying boat were dispatched to search for the submarine but failed to locate I-26 which fled north and then returned to Japan. One of the 5.5-inch shells was recovered by a naval shore patrol after the attack while additional shell fragments were found in 1973. An explosive demolition team from CFB Comox destroyed one explosive fragment while an inert fragment was presented to the Maritime Museum of British Columbia. Although the attack resulted in no damage or casualties, the subsequent decision to turn off the lights of outer stations caused difficulties for coastal shipping.

A 1995 episode of the CBC television newsmagazine program The Fifth Estate reported contradictions in eyewitness descriptions of the attacking vessel and speculated that the attack may have been a false flag conducted by Allied surface vessels with the intent of increasing domestic support for Prime Minister Mackenzie King and his wartime policies related to conscription.

Climate

See also
 List of lighthouses in British Columbia
 List of lighthouses in Canada
 Henri de Miffonis

References

External links
 Map of Estevan Point
 Aids to Navigation Canadian Coast Guard

Lighthouses completed in 1909
Lighthouses in British Columbia
Military history of Canada during World War II
Clayoquot Sound region
Spanish history in the Pacific Northwest
Vancouver Island
Headlands of British Columbia
Heritage sites in British Columbia
Lighthouses on the Canadian Register of Historic Places